Conus saucatsensis is an extinct species of sea snail, a marine gastropod mollusk in the family Conidae, the cone snails, cone shells or cones.

Description
The size of the shell attains 36 mm.

Distribution
This marine species is only known as a fossil from the Miocene found near Bordeaux, France.

References

 Cossmann (1896). Essais de Paleoconchologie Comparee 2 p. 148 ff
 Peyrot (1931). Conch. Neogen. L'.6 p. 39ff.,

External links
 Mayer-Eymar, C., 1891. Diagnoses Specierum Novarum. Naturforschenden Gesellschaft, Zurich. Vierteljahrschrift, 35 (Heft 3/4 ): 290 -301

saucatsensis